The Duncan Islands are a group of islands in the Torres Strait Islands archipelago, northwest of the Bramble Channel of Torres Strait in Queensland, Australia. The Duncan Islands are located within the Torres Strait Island Region local government area.

The Duncan Islands include three uninhabited islands:
 Kanig Island
 Maitak Island
 Meth Islet

See also

List of Torres Strait Islands

References

Torres Strait Islands
Torres Strait Island Region